The 145th Regiment Illinois Volunteer Infantry was an infantry regiment that served in the Union Army during the American Civil War. It was among scores of regiments that were raised in the summer of 1864 as Hundred Days Men, an effort to augment existing manpower for an all-out push to end the war within 100 days.

Service
The 145th Illinois Infantry was organized at Camp Butler, Illinois, and mustered into Federal service on June 9, 1864, for a one-hundred-day enlistment.  The 145th served in garrison in the Saint Louis, Missouri, area.

The regiment was mustered out of service on September 23, 1864.

Total strength and casualties
The regiment suffered 40 enlisted men who died of disease, for a total of 40 fatalities.

Commanders
Colonel George W. Lackey -  mustered out with the regiment.

See also
List of Illinois Civil War Units
Illinois in the American Civil War

Notes

References
The Civil War Archive

Units and formations of the Union Army from Illinois
Military units and formations established in 1864
1864 establishments in Illinois
Military units and formations disestablished in 1865